Winning Days is the second studio album by Australian alternative rock band The Vines, and was released on 23 March 2004 It is the follow-up to their debut, Highly Evolved. The enhanced CD has the music video for "Ride". Winning Days was recorded in the summer of 2003 at Bearsville Studios in Woodstock, New York and was assisted by Bill Synans. It was mixed in September 2003 at Cello Studios in Los Angeles and was assisted by Steven Rhodes.

This album has been released with the Copy Control protection system in some regions.

History
The Vines recorded Winning Days in May 2003 at Bearsville Studios with producer Rob Schnapf, who had also produced their debut album Highly Evolved. "Fuck the World" (later abbreviated to "F.T.W.") was the first song released from Winning Days and was released on 15 December 2003, three months prior to the album's release. The song is sarcastic in nature despite what its title seems to imply; as stated in a 2005 NME article, "Winning Days is anything but". During interviews given by lead singer Craig Nicholls in 2004, he stated "I definitely think the world is a good place, but maybe it would be better if people didn't hate so much and kill animals. At the same time, it's like, whatever. It's just a planet, that's all."

The next single "Ride" was released on 23 February 2004. "Ride" reached number 94 on Triple J's Hottest 100 of 2004.

The title track was released as the third and final single on 24 May 2004.

Critical reception
Winning Days was met with "mixed or average" reviews from critics. At Metacritic, which assigns a weighted average rating out of 100 to reviews from mainstream publications, this release received an average score of 50 based on 23 reviews.

Track listing

Personnel
Craig Nicholls – vocals, guitars, percussion, Moog
Patrick Matthews – bass guitar, piano and keyboards
Ryan Griffiths – guitars
Hamish Rosser – drums, percussion
Rob Schnapf – producer, mixing
Doug Boehm – engineering, mixing
Susanna Howe – album booklet photography
Love Police – album sleeve

Charts

References

External links
 
 

2004 albums
Capitol Records albums
The Vines (band) albums
Albums produced by Rob Schnapf